Tranquility Base Hotel & Casino Tour was the sixth headlining concert tour by English indie rock band Arctic Monkeys in support of their sixth studio album, Tranquility Base Hotel & Casino. The tour began on 2 May 2018 in San Diego, United States at The Observatory North Park and concluded on 7 April 2019 in Bogotá, Colombia at Estéreo Picnic Festival. This marks their first tour since AM Tour (2013–2014).

Development
The group announced their first North American headlining shows since 2014 and several festival dates on 12 March 2018. On 5 April, the group announced the release of their sixth studio album, Tranquility Base Hotel & Casino, to be released on 11 May. The group announced United Kingdom and Ireland dates on 9 April. In April, they announced extra dates in United Kingdom and United States. In November, the group announced Latin America dates.

On June 20, 2019, the band released a video documenting one of the final shows of the tour at the Foro Sol Stadium in Mexico City.

Songs performed

Whatever People Say I Am, That's What I'm Not
 "The View from the Afternoon"
 "I Bet You Look Good on the Dancefloor"
 "Dancing Shoes"
 "Mardy Bum"
 "From the Ritz to the Rubble"
 "A Certain Romance"

Favourite Worst Nightmare
 "Brianstorm"
 "Teddy Picker"
 "Fluorescent Adolescent"
 "Do Me a Favour"
 "505"

Humbug
 "Crying Lightning"
 "Cornerstone"
 "Pretty Visitors"

Suck It and See
 "The Hellcat Spangled Shalalala"
 "Don't Sit Down 'Cause I've Moved Your Chair"
 "Library Pictures"

AM
 "Do I Wanna Know?"
 "R U Mine?"
 "One for the Road"
 "Arabella"
 "No.1 Party Anthem"
 "Mad Sounds"
 "Fireside"
 "Why'd You Only Call Me When You're High?"
 "Snap Out of It"
 "Knee Socks"

Tranquility Base Hotel & Casino
 "Star Treatment"
 "One Point Perspective"
 "American Sports"
 "Tranquility Base Hotel & Casino"
 "Four Out of Five"
 "Science Fiction"
 "She Looks Like Fun"
 "Batphone"
 "The Ultracheese"

B-sides
 "You're So Dark"

Covers
 "Lipstick Vogue" by Elvis Costello & the Attractions
 "Is This It" by The Strokes
 "The Union Forever" by The White Stripes

Set list
Average set-list for the tour according to setlist.fm

"Four Out of Five"
"Brianstorm"
"Don't Sit Down 'Cause I've Moved Your Chair"
"Crying Lightning"
"Teddy Picker"
"Snap Out Of It"
"505"
"Do Me A Favour"
"Tranquility Base Hotel & Casino"
"One Point Perspective"
"Do I Wanna Know?"
"Cornerstone"
"Why'd You Only Call Me When You're High?"
"Knee Socks"
"I Bet You Look Good on the Dancefloor"
"Arabella"
"One for the Road"
"Pretty Visitors"

Encore
"The View from the Afternoon"
"Star Treatment"
"R U Mine?"

Tour dates

Personnel

Arctic Monkeys
 Alex Turner – lead vocals, electric guitar, acoustic guitar, baritone guitar, keyboards
 Jamie Cook – electric guitar, lap steel guitar, keyboards
 Nick O'Malley – bass guitar, backing vocals
 Matt Helders – drums, percussion, backing vocals

Touring members
 Scott Gillies – acoustic guitar, baritone guitar, lap steel guitar
 Tom Rowley – electric guitar, lap steel guitar, keyboards, backing vocals
 Davey Latter – percussion
 Tyler Parkford – keyboards, backing vocals

Guests
Miles Kane – electric guitar on "505"
Cam Avery – acoustic guitar on "Four Out of Five", keyboards on "Four Out of Five", "Tranquility Base Hotel & Casino" and "She Looks Like Fun", backing vocals on "Four Out of Five" and "She Looks Like Fun"

Notes

References

Arctic Monkeys
2018 concert tours
2019 concert tours